Obeng Regan (born 15 August 1994) is a Ghanaian footballer who plays as a defensive and attacking midfielder for Serbian club FK Novi Sad.

Club career

Kotoko
Born in Kumasi, he played in Ghana with Fetteh Feyenoord academy before being signed by Asante Kotoko SC in 2010.  He debuted for Kotoko in the 2010–11 Ghana Premier League having made 4 appearances in the league that season under the coach Bogdan Korak.

Napredak
Regan moved to Serbia where he spent one year attending high school in the city of Čačak and training with local teams Borac and Sloboda. Earlier he had also trained with clubs in England and the Netherlands.  In summer 2012 he signed with FK Napredak Kruševac who brought him along another Ghanaian, Harif Mohammed, also former Asante Kotoko player.  Initially he played with Napredak youth squad, but soon he made his league debut for the senior team by playing against OFK Mladenovac, on August 25, 2012.  At the end of the 2012–13 Serbian First League season Napredak finished top, and thus won promotion to the 2013–14 Serbian SuperLiga. In May 2014, Regan went on a trial with Ajax, and Ajax's coach Frank de Boer reportedly wanted to sign him.

Čukarički
Regan signed a four-year contract with Čukarički on 17 August 2014.

Železničar Pančevo
On 18 August 2021, he joined Železničar Pančevo.

Honours
Napredak
 Serbian First League: 2012–13

Čukarički
 Serbian Cup: 2014–15

References

1994 births
Footballers from Kumasi
Living people
Ghanaian footballers
Association football midfielders
Asante Kotoko S.C. players
FK Napredak Kruševac players
FK Čukarički players
NK Inter Zaprešić players
NK Istra 1961 players
FK Mladost Lučani players
FK Železničar Pančevo players
Serbian First League players
Serbian SuperLiga players
Croatian Football League players
Ghanaian expatriate footballers
Expatriate footballers in Serbia
Ghanaian expatriate sportspeople in Serbia
Expatriate footballers in Croatia
Ghanaian expatriate sportspeople in Croatia